Bruce Alastair McKelvie (November 19, 1889 – April 17, 1960) was a Canadian journalist and historian. He signed his books as B.A. McKelvie.

Biography
McKelvie was born in British Columbia to Scottish born parents who had previously lived in Quebec. His father worked as a machinist. McKelvie started work as an printer's apprentice at a newspaper. He worked at a variety of jobs in the business before he became a police reporter for the Vancouver Daily Province in 1913. He was on board the tugboat Sea Lion during the Komagata Maru incident in 1914. He also worked for the Vancouver Sun and the Victoria Colonist. He wrote several books that popularized British Columbia history.

Works
 Early history of the province of British Columbia, (1926)
 Huldowget: A Story of The North Pacific Coast, (1926)
 The Black Canyon: A Story of '58, (1927)
 Pelts And Powder: A Story of The West Coast in the Making, (1929)
 Vancouver Island's urgent need for a new deal, (1931)
 Legends Of Stanley Park, (1941)
 Victoria, B.C. 1843-1943, (1943)
 Fort Langley, outpost of Empire, (1946)
 Maquinna the magnificent, (1946)
 Tales of conflict:Indian-White murders and massacres in pioneer British Columbia (1950)
 Challenge from the north, (1952)
 Pageant of B.C.: glimpses into the romantic development of Canada's far western province, (1957)
 HBC in BC, (1958)

Posthumous
 Magic, Murder and Mystery, (1966)

Source:

References

External links
 
 Find a Grave

1889 births
1960 deaths
20th-century Canadian historians
20th-century Canadian journalists
Canadian male journalists
Journalists from British Columbia
Writers from Vancouver